Lecture Notes in Physics (LNP) is a book series published by Springer Science+Business Media in the field of physics, including articles related to both research and teaching.  It was established in 1969.

See also
 Lecture Notes in Computer Science
 Lecture Notes in Mathematics

External links 
 

Publications established in 1969
Physics books
Series of books
Springer Science+Business Media books